Idle Hands is a 1999 American teen black comedy horror film directed by Rodman Flender, written by Terri Hughes and Ron Milbauer, and starring Devon Sawa, Seth Green, Elden Henson, Jessica Alba, and Vivica A. Fox. The main plot follows the life of an average lazy stoner teenager, Anton Tobias, whose hand becomes possessed and goes on a killing spree, even after being cut off from his arm.

The film's title is based on the saying "idle hands are the Devil's play-things" or "the devil makes work for idle hands". The film received negative reviews from critics and grossed over $4 million from an estimated $25 million budget.

Plot
Mr. and Mrs. Tobias are settling into bed when they notice a message on the ceiling and hear a noise from outside. Mr. Tobias goes to check what the noise was, while Mrs. Tobias calls the police, but she gets dragged under the bed and killed.

Their lazy stoner son Anton hasn't noticed their disappearance in seven days. One morning, Anton runs out of weed and goes to his friend Pnub's house to get some more, but he says he's ran out of weed too. Pnub and his other friend Mick suggest that Anton should go and talk to his neighbour Molly, the girl that he likes. He sees Molly dropped her lyrics book and goes to return it, but he ends up being pretty awkward.

Anton goes home and makes himself a sandwich and he notices the knife he's using is covered in blood and his cat Bones playing with an eyeball. Running in a panic, he trips and finds his parents' corpses. Mick and Pnub show up and Anton shows them the bodies, then they figure out that the killer is Anton. Mick tries to call 911, but Anton pulls out the phone chord and claims that he isn't the killer, but he murders Micks with a glass bottle. Anton promises Pnub that he didn't mean to do it, but they find out Anton's hand is possessed. His hand chases Pnub into the basement and tries to stop his hand so Pnub can escape, but his hand overpowers him and decapitates Pnub. Anton's hand throws Bones out the window and he goes to look for him, but the hand pulls him onto Molly's porch and rings her door bell. Molly takes Anton into her room to make out, but her parents come home so Anton leaves. Anton buries his friends' and parents' corpses in his backyard, but Mick and Pnub come back as zombies and knock him out.

Meanwhile, a druidic high priestess named Debi LeCure is hunting the spirit responsible for killings across the country. After his hand kills two cops in his living room, Anton cuts it off with a cleaver. Pnub and Mick seek out a First-Aid Kit while Anton traps the hand in a microwave, burning it. Meanwhile, Debi (now along with Randy, Anton's neighbor) hunts Anton down to put a stop to the possessed hand. After sending Molly to the school dance, Anton returns home to finish off the hand. Unfortunately Pnub and Mick inadvertently release the hand. The three then steal Randy's truck and head to the school. Mick and Pnub go to the Halloween dance to watch over Molly, while Anton looks for the hand. Randy and Debi meet up with Anton. Debi explains that the hand will drag Molly's soul into the netherworld. Anton crashes the dance and tries to warn everyone about his hand, but is ignored.

The hand then scalps the band's lead singer and causes a panic. Molly and her friend Tanya escape through the vents. They attempt to go through a fan, which they have stopped with Tanya's shoe, but Tanya gets hung on the rope, Molly tries to pulls Tanya off the fan and Anton's hand ends up removing Tanya's shoe, allowing her to be pulled to her death in the fan. Molly then runs into the art room, causing her to get knocked out. Anton enters and fights with the hand while it is inside a puppet but it escapes to the auto shop, where Molly is strapped to a car in her bra and panties, being raised toward the ceiling. Anton, Mick, and Pnub fight with the hand over the controls. Mick finds a mechanic's bong and he and Pnub smoke "for strength". Anton blows some smoke into the hand (still inside a hand-puppet) until it drops the controls and they save Molly. Debi throws a ritual knife into the hand, stopping it in a puff of smoke and fire. She and Randy take off for "ritualistic sex." Anton releases Molly from the top of the car, they go under the car and start making out. In the process of lighting the bong for Mick, Pnub accidentally hits the controls for the car, and Anton is crushed by the car.

In the film's conclusion, Anton is in a body-cast in the hospital, having given up heaven to stay with Molly, and Mick and Pnub are now his Guardian angels. When he is left alone in his room, Anton looks up and sees the message "I am under the bed" written on the ceiling. Mick and Pnub walk down the hall, pondering if they should tell Anton they were the ones that wrote the message, but decide against it, laughing.

In a post-credit scene, the voice of The Hand vows that he will be back telling Anton that "we all go a little crazy sometimes. Just don't look under the bed."

Cast

 Devon Sawa as Anton Tobias
 Seth Green as Mick
 Elden Henson as Pnub
 Jessica Alba as Molly
 Vivica A. Fox as Debi LeCure
 Jack Noseworthy as Randy
 Christopher Hart as The Hand
 Robert Englund as the voice of The Hand 
 Steve Van Wormer as Curtis
 Fred Willard as Mr. Tobias
 Connie Ray as Mrs. Tobias
 Katie Wright as Tanya
 Kelly Monaco as Tiffany
 Sean Whalen as Officer McMacy
 Nick Sadler as Officer Ruck
 Randy Oglesby as Sheriff Buchanan
 Timothy Stack as Principal Tidwell
 The Offspring as Themselves 
 Dexter Holland as Himself
 Mindy Sterling as Lady Bowler
 Joey Slotnick as Burger Jungle Manager
 Tom DeLonge as Burger Jungle Employee
 Kyle Gass as Burger Jungle Guy

Release

Box office
The film opened on April 30, 1999, in 1,611 theaters. It grossed $1.8 million during its first week, and then a total of just over $4 million on a budget of $20–25 million, making it a box office flop. The film's release was hindered by coming out the same month of the Columbine High School massacre, which even led distributor Columbia to consider a delay,  ultimately cancelling the premiere and seeing many theaters, especially in Colorado, where the school shooting happened, deciding not to screen Idle Hands. Senator Joe Lieberman berated Idle Hands in Congress as "another grossly violent film targeted at teens that uses killing as a form of comic relief", with particular scorn for the marketing campaign.

Production note
An elaborate swimming pool sequence utilizing a large pool model, "wall of hands" and a "hell hole" visual was initially planned as the film's final "hand" encounter. However, initial post viewing tests suggested the ending didn't quite mesh with the overall intended tone of the film. A replacement shop class sequence with both comic and horror elements was substituted, delaying the film's release by several months. The original swimming pool sequence with mostly completed effects can be watched as a bonus feature on DVD presentations.

Critical reception
On review aggregator website Rotten Tomatoes, as of March 2020, the film had a 15% rating based on 55 reviews, with an average rating of 3.39/10. The site's consensus stated: "An uneasy mix of slapstick and gore, Idle Hands lacks the manic energy and comedic inspiration required to pull off its goofy premise". Metacritic reports a 31 out of 100 rating based on 20 critics, indicating "generally unfavorable reviews".

Jeremy Wheeler at Allmovie.com gave the film a positive review stating: "It's definitely a case of better than you think. This horror comedy is high on gags and giant doses of marijuana... as is the love for gore and decapitated hand insanity to entertain any happy horror fiend."

Soundtrack
A soundtrack album for Idle Hands was released through Time Bomb Recordings two weeks in advance of the film, featuring mostly punk rock and heavy metal artists. Though appearing on the album, the songs "Enthused" by Blink-182, "Mama Said Knock You Out" by The Waking Hours, "Bleeding Boy" by Disappointment Incorporated, and "My Girlfriend's Dead" by The Vandals were not used in the film. Chuck Donkers of Allmusic rated the album two stars out of five, remarking that it "befits a combination teen comedy/horror flick that climaxes at a high school dance" and "features songs from over-the-top adolescent favorites".

In addition to those on the soundtrack album, the following songs are also used in the film:
{{Track listing
| extra_column    = Performer
| title1   = Bloodclot
| note1    = from Life Won't Wait, 1998
| writer1  = Tim Armstrong, Lars Frederiksen
| extra1   = Rancid
| length1  = 2:45
| title2   = Core (In Time)
| note2    = from This Euphoria, 1998
| writer2  = David Garza
| extra2   = David Garza
| length2  = 3:06
| title3   = Glow in the Dark
| note3    = from This Euphoria, 1998
| writer3  = David Garza
| extra3   = David Garza
| length3  = 3:09
| title4   = How Do You Feel
| note4    = from Slow to Burn, 1996
| writer4  = Peter Daou, Vanessa Daou
| extra4   = Vanessa Daou
| length4  = 3:51
| title5   = I Am a Pig
| note5    = from Voyeurs, 1998
| writer5  = Rob Halford, John Lowery, Bob Marlette
| extra5   = 2wo
| length5  = 3:37
| title6   = I Wanna Be Sedated
| note6    = originally performed by the Ramones
| writer6  = Dee Dee Ramone, Joey Ramone, Johnny Ramone
| extra6   = The Offspring
| length6  = 2:19
| title7   = Mindtrip
| note7    = from Zebrahead, 1998
| writer7  = Ed Udhus, Ali Tabatabaee, Greg Bergdorf, Justin Mauriello, Ben Osmundson
| extra7   = Zebrahead
| length7  = 2:15
| title8   = New York Groove
| note8    = originally performed by Hello; from Ace Frehley, 1978
| writer8  = Russ Ballard
| extra8   = Ace Frehley
| length8  = 3:01
| title9   = Peppyrock
| note9    = from Birth Through Knowledge, 1998
| writer9  = Lo-Ki, Stone Groove, DJ Spinz, Adam Carlo, Sam Cino, Matt DeMatteo
| extra9   = Birth Through Knowledge
| length9  = 4:25
| title10  = Pop That Coochie
| note10   = from Sports Weekend: As Nasty as They Wanna Be, Pt. 2, 1991
| writer10 = David Hobbs, Chris Wong Won
| extra10  = 2 Live Crew
| length10 = 4:17
| title11  = Santeria
| note11   = from Sublime, 1996
| writer11 = Bradley Nowell, Bud Gaugh, Eric Wilson
| extra11  = Sublime
| length11 = 3:03
}}

In popular culture
The film was parodied in the Robot Chicken episode "Dragon Nuts", in the sketch "Idle Nuts". The sketch has essentially the same plot as the original movie, but involving possessed testicles instead of a possessed hand.

It the season two episode "The Sinners Are Much More Fun" of the TV series Chucky'', Devon Sawa's character says the line "Idle hands, are the devil's playground."

References

External links

 
 
 
 

1999 films
1990s English-language films
Films directed by Rodman Flender
1999 horror films
1990s black comedy films
1990s comedy horror films
1990s supernatural films
1990s teen comedy films
1990s teen horror films
American black comedy films
American comedy horror films
American supernatural horror films
American teen comedy films
American teen horror films
American body horror films
Halloween horror films
Films scored by Graeme Revell
Films shot in Los Angeles
Columbia Pictures films
Demons in film
1999 comedy films
Films produced by Suzanne Todd
American splatter films
Stoner films
1990s American films